The Ussuri shrew (Sorex mirabilis), also known as the giant shrew, is a species of shrew found in Northeast Asia. It is found in valleys and on the forested slopes of mountains in the Korean Peninsula, northeastern China, and the Russian Far East. It is rarely observed, and its ecology is largely unknown.

Description
Both the dorsal pelage and the underparts are iron grey. The large size, robust tail and various details of the dentition help to distinguish this shrew from other species.

Distribution and habitat
The Ussuri shrew is native to northeastern China, northeastern Korea and southeastern Russia. It prefers moist locations and also occurs in marshes at higher altitudes.

Ecology
The Ussuri shrew is a terrestrial species and creates burrows. Although it also eats insects, other invertebrates and carrion, about 82% of its diet consists of earthworms, and because of their relatively low nutritional value, it needs to eat more than twice its bodyweight each day. It is presumed to nest underground but its breeding habits are little known. There is normally one litter per year and by August, the young are sometimes caught in traps. A second litter may be born when circumstances permit, and the young become sexually mature at 11 months of age.

Status
The International Union for Conservation of Nature does not have enough information on this species to rate its conservation status, and has listed it as being "data deficient". However, the Ussuri shrew has a wide range and, despite being a rarely seen and poorly known species, when more information becomes available, it may turn out to be of "least concern".

References

External links

Zipcode Zoo

Sorex
Mammals of Korea
Mammals described in 1937
Mammals of China
Mammals of Russia